Aubrey Mallalieu (8 June 1873 – 28 May 1948) was an English actor with a prolific career in supporting roles in films in the 1930s and 1940s.

Mallalieu began life as George William Mallalieu, the son of William Mallalieu (c. 1845–1927), a well-known stage comedian, and his wife Margaret Ellen Smith. He had a sister called Polly who corresponded with Lewis Carroll in the 1890s. He adopted the stage name of Aubrey early in his acting career.

Information is scant on Mallalieu's pre-film career, but he is believed to have had a lengthy stage career before making the move into films. Archive sources available in New Zealand indicate that he spent a considerable number of years touring with stage companies in that country and Australia in the 1900s and 1910s.

In December 1912 Mallalieu was touring Australia with Leal Douglas in a piece called “Feed the Brute”. The two formed a company and took it on a tour of South Africa, and then in May 1913 they travelled together to England on the SS Ballarat, when The Era reported that Mallalieu was returning after an absence of five years.

Mallalieu may also have played supporting roles during the silent film era in Britain, but no named credits have been located as it was rare for supporting players to be name-checked at this period.

Mallalieu's first named film credit dates from 1934, and thereafter he accumulated 115 screen appearances before his death in 1948. These were overwhelmingly minor roles, many in quota quickies and B films, although Mallalieu also played in a considerable number of  prestigious and well-known productions such as The Stars Look Down (1940), The Young Mr. Pitt (1942), For You Alone (1945), The Wicked Lady (1945), Frieda (1947) and The Winslow Boy (1948).

Selected filmography 

1934: What Happened to Harkness? – Dr. Powin
1935: The Riverside Murder – Robert Norman
1935: Cross Currents – Gen. Trumpington
1935: Play Up the Band – Judge (uncredited)
1936: A Touch of the Moon – Mr. Dupare
1936: Prison Breaker – Sir Douglas Mergin
1936: Music Hath Charms – Judge
1936: Once in a Million
1936: Sweeney Todd: The Demon Barber of Fleet Street – Trader Paterson
1936: Love at Sea – Brighton
1936: The Last Journey – Mulchester Doctor (uncredited)
1936: Not So Dusty – (uncredited)
1936: Broken Blossoms – Minor Role (uncredited)
1936: A Star Fell from Heaven – Doctor (uncredited)
1936: The Tenth Man – Bank Manager
1936: Talk of the Devil – (uncredited)
1936: Such Is Life – Sallust
1936: Parisian Life
1936: Nothing Like Publicity – Mr. Dines
1937: The Black Tulip – Colonel Marnix
1937: Mayfair Melody – Dighton
1937: Pearls Bring Tears – Mr. Vane
1937: Patricia Gets Her Man – Colonel Fitzroy
1937: Strange Adventures of Mr. Smith – Mr. Broadbent
1937: Fifty-Shilling Boxer – Charles Day
1937: All That Glitters – Flint
1937: Silver Blaze – Doctor at Stables (uncredited)
1937: Over She Goes – 1st Man with Suitcase (uncredited)
1937: Keep Fit – Magistrate
1937: Victoria the Great – Bishop at the Palace (uncredited)
1937: Change for a Sovereign – Baron Breit
1937: The Rat – The Jeweller (uncredited)
1937: The Last Chance – Judge Croyle
1937: East of Ludgate Hill
1937: When the Devil Was Well – Banks
1937: The Reverse Be My Lot – Dr. Davidson
1937: Holiday's End – Bellamy
1938: Easy Riches – Mr. Marsden
1938: Paid in Error – George
1938: The Claydon Treasure Mystery – Lord Claydon
1938: Simply Terrific – Sir Walter Carfax
1938: Coming of Age – Mr. Myers
1938: Almost a Honeymoon – Clutterbuck
1938: Thank Evans – Magistrate
1938: His Lordship Regrets – Dawkins
1938: The Return of Carol Deane – Lamont
1938: Dangerous Medicine – Judge
1938: Save a Little Sunshine – Official
1938: You're the Doctor – Vicar
1939: His Lordship Goes to Press – Hardcastle
1938: The Return of the Frog – Banker
1938: The Gables Mystery – Sir James Rider
1938: Miracles Do Happen – Prof. Gilmore
1939: Me and My Pal – Governor
1939: Dead Men are Dangerous – Coroner
1939: So This Is London – Butler (uncredited)
1939: The Face at the Window – M. de Brisson
1939: I Killed the Count – Johnson
1939: Murder Will Out
1940: 21 Days – Magistrate
1940: The Stars Look Down – Hudspeth
1940: All at Sea – Prof. Myles
1940: Busman's Honeymoon – Rev. Simon Goodacre
1940: The Briggs Family – Milward
1940: Bulldog Sees It Through – Magistrate
1940: The Door with Seven Locks – Lord Charles Francis Selford
1940: Spare a Copper – Manager of Music Store
1940: Salvage with a Smile (Short) – Professor
1941: Turned Out Nice Again – Irate Customer (uncredited)
1941: "Pimpernel" Smith – Dean
1941: Facing the Music
1941: Atlantic Ferry – Minor role (uncredited)
1941: Mr. Proudfoot Shows a Light (Short) – Chairman
1942: The Black Sheep of Whitehall – Ticket Collector
1942: Penn of Pennsylvania – King's Chaplain
1942: Hatter's Castle – Clergyman
1942: Gert and Daisy's Weekend – Barnes
1942: The Missing Million – Minor Role
1942: Back-Room Boy – West (uncredited)
1942: Breach of Promise – Judge
1942: They Flew Alone – Bill, the Barber
1942: Unpublished Story – Warden (uncredited)
1942: Let the People Sing – Cmdr. Spofforth
1942: Uncensored – Louis Backer
1942: The Goose Steps Out – Rector
1942: Gert and Daisy Clean Up – Judge (uncredited)
1942: The Young Mr. Pitt – Somerset (uncredited)
1942: Asking for Trouble – General Fortescue
1943: We'll Meet Again – Stage Door Keeper
1943: Squadron Leader X – Pierre
1943: The Adventures of Tartu – ARP Warden (uncredited)
1943: Rhythm Serenade – Vicar
1943: The Dark Tower – Doctor
1943: Yellow Canary – Reynolds (uncredited)
1943: My Learned Friend – Magistrate
1943: Somewhere in Civvies – Doctor (uncredited)
1943: The Demi-Paradise – Toomes – the Butler
1943: The Lamp Still Burns – Rev. J. Ashton (uncredited)
1944: Champagne Charlie – Butler (uncredited)
1944: He Snoops to Conquer – Councillor Stubbins
1945: Kiss the Bride Goodbye – Rev. Glory
1945: A Place of One's Own – Canon Mowbray
1945: I Live in Grosvenor Square – Bates
1945: For You Alone – Eye Specialist (uncredited)
1945: 29 Acacia Avenue – Martin
1945: Murder in Reverse? – Judge
1945: The Wicked Lady – Doctor
1946: Under New Management – John Marshall
1946: I'll Turn to You – Managing Director (uncredited)
1946: Bedelia – Vicar
1946: A Girl in a Million – Judge
1946: School for Secrets – 1st Club Member
1947: While the Sun Shines – Night Porter
1947: Meet Me at Dawn – Prefect of Police
1947: Frieda – Irvine
1947: Master of Bankdam – Dr. Bouviere
1947: The Ghosts of Berkeley Square – Butler (uncredited)
1948: The Fatal Night – Yokel
1948: Counterblast – Maj. Walsh
1948: Calling Paul Temple – Waiter at The Falcon Inn
1948: Bond Street – Parkins (uncredited)
1948: The Winslow Boy – Mr. Roberts (uncredited)
1948: Saraband for Dead Lovers – Envoy at Ahlden
1949: The Queen of Spades – Fedya
1949: The Bad Lord Byron – 1st Old club member (final film role)

References

External links 
 

1873 births
1948 deaths
20th-century English male actors
British expatriate male actors in Australia
British expatriate male actors in New Zealand
English expatriates in Australia
English expatriates in New Zealand
English male stage actors
English male film actors
Male actors from Liverpool